Wrightsville is an unincorporated community in Fairfield Township, Madison County, Ohio, United States. Some national maps mistakenly show Wrightsville in Franklin County.

The Wrightsville Post Office was established on January 23, 1888, but was discontinued on January 15, 1901.  The mail service is now sent through the Georgesville branch.

References

Unincorporated communities in Madison County, Ohio
Unincorporated communities in Ohio